John B. Ames (born January 2, 1983 in Saint John, New Brunswick) is a Canadian politician, who was elected to the Legislative Assembly of New Brunswick in the 2014 provincial election. He represented Saint Croix as a member of the Liberal Party, but was voted out by the people of Charlotte-Campobello / Saint Croix in the September 24, 2018 election, being replaced by Greg Thompson.

He was appointed to the New Brunswick Cabinet on June 6, 2016 where he took on the portfolios of Tourism, Heritage and Culture. He sat on Her Majesty's Executive Council Office in his capacity as Minister of the Crown, serving on various committees.

Prior to his election to the NB Legislature, Ames was a municipal councillor in St. Stephen. He served as deputy mayor from May 2012 to September 2014.

References

1983 births
Living people
Members of the Executive Council of New Brunswick
New Brunswick Liberal Association MLAs
New Brunswick municipal councillors
Politicians from Saint John, New Brunswick
People from St. Stephen, New Brunswick
21st-century Canadian politicians